This is a list of Indonesia football transfers for the 2017 season transfer window. Liga 1

Liga 1

Arema

In:

Out:

Bali United

In:

Out:

Barito Putera

In:

Out:

Bhayangkara

In:

Out:

Madura United

In:

Out:

Mitra Kukar

In:

Out:

Gresik United

Persela Lamongan

Perseru Serui

Persib Bandung

In:

Out:

Persiba Balikpapan

In:

Out:

Persija Jakarta

In:

Out:

Persipura Jayapura

In:

Out:

PS TNI

In:

Out:

PSM Makassar

In:

Out:

Pusamania Borneo

In:

Out:

Semen Padang

In:

Out:

Sriwijaya

In:

Out:

References

2017 Liga 1
2017 in Indonesian football
Lists of Indonesian football transfers
Indonesia